The India cricket team toured New Zealand from January to March 2020 to play two Tests, three One Day Internationals (ODIs) and five Twenty20 International (T20I) matches. The Test series formed part of the inaugural 2019–2021 ICC World Test Championship. New Zealand Cricket confirmed the fixtures for the tour in June 2019.

India won the first three T20I matches to give them an unassailable lead in the series. The third T20I was decided by a Super Over, after both teams made 179 runs from their twenty overs. This gave India their first T20I series win in New Zealand. Kane Williamson was ruled out of the fourth T20I with a shoulder injury, with Tim Southee named as New Zealand's captain in Williamson's absence. The fourth T20I was also tied, with India once again winning the match in the Super Over. India won the final T20I match to take the series 5–0, becoming the first side to whitewash another team in a five-match bilateral T20 series. Williamson's injury also ruled him out of the first two ODIs, with Tom Latham captaining the side.

New Zealand won the first two ODIs, therefore giving them an unassailable lead in the series. New Zealand won the third match by five wickets, to give them a 3–0 series win, and their first clean sweep against India in an ODI series with three or more matches. It was the first time that India was whitewashed in an ODI series since losing 5–0 to the West Indies in March 1989.

During the tour, New Zealand's Ross Taylor became the first cricketer to play in 100 matches in all three formats of international cricket. New Zealand won the first Test by ten wickets to record their 100th victory in Test match cricket. New Zealand won the second Test by seven wickets, taking the series 2–0, and extending their record of being undefeated at home to thirteen Test matches. It was the first time that India had been whitewashed in a Test series under Virat Kohli's captaincy.

Squads

Ahead of the tour Shikhar Dhawan was ruled out of India's squad, after he suffered a shoulder injury during the third ODI against Australia. Prithvi Shaw and Sanju Samson replaced Dhawan in India's ODI and T20I squads respectively. India's Rohit Sharma was ruled out of the rest of the series, after suffering a calf injury during the fifth and final T20I match. Mayank Agarwal was named as Sharma's replacement in India's ODI squad. New Zealand's Kane Williamson suffered an injury during the T20I series and was ruled out of the first two ODI matches, with Mark Chapman added to their squad. After several players in the New Zealand squad became ill, Ish Sodhi and Blair Tickner were called up to the team for the third ODI match. Prior to the Test series, Matt Henry was added to New Zealand's squad as cover for Neil Wagner, who was awaiting the birth of his first child.

Tour match

Three-day match: New Zealand XI vs India

T20I series

1st T20I

2nd T20I

3rd T20I

4th T20I

5th T20I

ODI series

1st ODI

2nd ODI

3rd ODI

Test series

1st Test

2nd Test

Notes

References

External links
 Series home at ESPN Cricinfo

2020 in New Zealand cricket
2020 in Indian cricket
International cricket competitions in 2019–20
Indian cricket tours of New Zealand